Mahlet Mulugeta (born 20 March 1995) is an Ethiopian middle-distance runner. She competed in the women's 800 metres at the 2017 World Championships in Athletics.

References

External links

1995 births
Living people
Ethiopian female middle-distance runners
World Athletics Championships athletes for Ethiopia
Place of birth missing (living people)
21st-century Ethiopian women